Dalibor Grubačević (born January 9, 1975) is a Croatian composer, musician and record producer renowned for his works in the field of film music.

Biography
Dalibor Grubačević was born in Koprivnica (modern-day Croatia), where he grew up and completed his early education. Already as a young boy, he presented an exceptional musical talent and at the age of six he started learning to play guitar and piano. Later on, as a member of the local cultural and artistic society 'Koprivnica', he also learned to play the tamburica. In the 1990s he became increasingly attracted to rock 'n' roll and inspired by The Beatles he became a member of the pop-rock band 'The Bugs'. He then continued his musical education and journey of musical discovery by studying classical music forms and works of composers of classical music, attending private lessons with prof. Natalija Imbrišak and Maestro Miljenko Prohaska. In 1993, he began studying Social Work at the Faculty of Law in Zagreb, however two years later he interrupted his studies in order to fully dedicate himself to music.

To date, he collaborated with many prominent Croatian directors, such as Branko Ištvančić (The Ghost in the Swamp, The Bridge at the End of the World), Miro Andrić (Aquatic treasures of Croatia), Miro Branković (In Search of Marko Polo), Nenad Puhovski (Together), Zoran Budak (Hebrang), Višnja Starešina (The Silenced Voice) and others, for whose films he composed music. Whilst composing film music, Grubačević very successfully combines a variety of musical genres and classical orchestration with electronic sounds and instruments.

In addition to scores and soundtracks for feature films and documentaries, as well as various advertising films, Grubačević as a musician is equally successful in the fields of pop, rock and ethno music. Apart from in Croatia, his compositions and musical arrangements have been performed in Macedonia, Montenegro, Canada, America, Japan, England, Italy, Israel and Georgia. He has worked and collaborated with many Croatian and foreign composers, musicians and music producers, for example, Eric Ewazen, Alan Holley, Zagreb Soloists, Simply Brass Quintet, Miroslav Evačić and Zoran Džorlev as well as with singers Toše Proeski, Sasa Lozar, Aleksandar Mitevski, Daniel Kajmakoski, Dario Pankovski and pop-rock band Pavel.

Dalibor Grubačević is a member of the Croatian Composers' Society and the Croatian Freelance Artists Association.

Works (selection)

Compositions 
 Rondo for string orchestra (2002)
 Jesenji valcer (Autumn Waltz) for tamburica orchestra (2005)
 Ricordi del passato for strings quartet (2010)
 Dvije rijeke (Two Rivers) for brass quintet (2010), inspired by the two great Croatian rivers Drava and Mura, dedicated to and premiered by Simply Brass Quintet
 Solid Pictures for French horn and piano (2014)
 Valse balkanique (Balkan waltz) for brass quintet (2018)
 Concerto for tuba and orchestra (2021)
 Csárdás suite for strings (2021)

Film scores 
 2005 – Izgubljeno blago (The Lost Treasure), documentary, director: Branko Ištvančić, HRT
 2006 – Duh u močvari (The Ghost in the Swamp), feature film, directed by: Branko Ištvančić, HRT & Interfilm d.o.o.
 2007 – Tesla, documentary, director: Miro Branković, HRT
 2009 – Zajedno (Together), documentary, director: Nenad Puhovski, Factum d.o.o.
 2010 – Zaustavljeni glas (Silenced voice), documentary, director: Višnja Starešina, HRT & Interfilm d.o.o.
 2011 – Album, documentary, director: Branko Ištvančić, Factum d.o.o.
 2012/2013 – Hrvatsko vodeno blago (Aquatic treasures of Croatia), documentary TV series, director: Miro Andrić, HRT & Car-Herc d.o.o.
 2013 – Slavoljub Penkala – documentary, director: Milka Barišić, HRT
 2013 – U potrazi za Markom Polom (In Search of Marco Polo), documentary TV miniseries, director: Miro Branković, HRT
 2014 – Dragi Lastane! (Dear Lastan!), documentary, director: Irena Škorić, Artizana film d.o.o.
 2014 – Most na kraju svijeta (The Bridge at the End of the World), feature film, director: Branko Ištvančić, Artizana film d.o.o. & HRT
 2016 – Zbog tebe (Because of You), feature film, director: Anđelo Jurkas, B produkcija, DOP Produkcija
 2017 – Fuck off I Love You, feature film, director: Anđelo Jurkas, B produkcija, DOP Produkcija
 2018 - Više od riječi (More than Words), TV series, director: Miro Branković, HRT
 2020 - Rivers of Croatia, documentary, director: Goran Šafarek, Šafarek produkcija, 3BoxMedia
 2021 - The Match, feature film, director: Dominik and Jakov Sedlar, Ollendorff center, Oluja film, Mutiny Pictures
 2021 - The Cars We Drove Into Capitalism, documentary, directors: Boris Missirkov, Georgi Bogdanov, Agitprop
 2022 - The Conversation, feature film, director: Dominik Sedlar, Quiet Storm Productions, Croatia Film

Discography

Albums 
 2006 – Duh u močvari (The Ghost in the Swamp – original motion picture soundtrack), Croatia Records, CD 5695899
 2011 – artEdox – Film music, Aquarius Records, CD 377–11
 2012 – U potrazi za Markom Polom (In search of Marco Polo) (music from TV miniseries), Aquarius Records, CD 467–12
 2015 – Most na kraju svijeta (The Bridge at the End of the World) (original motion picture soundtrack), Aquarius Records,  CD 9841093
 2021 – Dalibor Grubačević performed by the Zagreb Soloists (Live at Tuškanac Summer Stage), Aquarius Records,  LP 18-21 
 2021 – The Match (Original Motion Picture Soundtrack), Plaza Mayor Company Ltd., SERG300

Production 
 2007 – CD Fulmination / Miroslav Evačić & Čardaš Blues Band, Croatia Records, CD 5751410
 2010 – CD Camminate / Simply Brass, Cantus Records, CD 98898492102
 2019 – CD Serbus! / Zagrebački orkestar ZET-a, ZET CD001  
 2019 – CD Signali / Hrvoje Pintarić, Tamara Jurkić Sviben, Cantus Records, CD 88924501542

Awards 
 2010 – Award for best music in a documentary film Together by director Nenad Puhovski at the 19th 'Days of Croatian Film'
 2013 – Discography Award 'Porin' in the category for the Best album of original music for theatre, film and /or TV (for the album In Search of Marko Polo)
 2016 – Award for best music in a documentary film It Was Just a Good Dream by director Branko Istvancic at the 7th 'Religious Film Festival' - Trsat (Croatia)
 2022 – Silver Medal / Outstanding Achievement in the category Film Soundtrack and Album for the music from the film The Match, at the Global Music Awards competition - USA
 2022 – Crystal Pine Award for best music in a feature film The Conversation directed by Dominik Sedlar at the 10th 'International sound & film music festival' - ISFMF 2022

References

External links
Dalibor Grubačević – Official site
Hrvatsko društvo skladatelja: Grubačević, Dalibor (biography) (in Croatian)
HDS ZAMP: Dalibor Grubačević (works) (in Croatian)
Croatia Records: Dalibor Grubačević (biography and filmography) (in Croatian)
Ravno do dna.com – Anđelo Jurkas: »Dalibor Grubačević – čarobnjak (ne samo) filmske glazbe« (interview) (in Croatian)
Klasika.hr – Irena Paulus: »Na putu s velikim pustolovom« (interview) (in Croatian)
Filmovi.hr – Irena Paulus: »Without Music it wouldn't be the same Film!« (review of the album ArtEdox)
Matica.hr / Vijenac – Irena Paulus: »Rijedak fenomen« (review of the album The Ghost in the Swamp) (in Croatian)
Discogs.com – Dalibor Grubačević (discography)
IMDb: Dalibor Grubačević (filmography)
YouTube: Dalibor Grubačević (official channel)

1975 births
Croatian film score composers
Male film score composers
Croatian composers
20th-century classical composers
21st-century classical composers
People from Koprivnica
Living people
20th-century male musicians
21st-century male musicians